A list of the published works of David Denby, American journalist and film critic.

Books

Non–fiction

Memoir

Essays and reporting

2000–2009
  Reviews François Truffaut's The Wild Child (1970).
  Reviews Ron Howard's Frost/Nixon (2008) and Baz Luhrmann's Australia (2008).
  Reviews Edwards Zwick's Defiance and Abdellatif Kechiche's The Secret of the Grain.

2010–2014
  Reviews Tim Blake Nelson's Leaves of Grass (2009), Raymond De Felitta's City Island (2009) and Andy Tennant's The Bounty Hunter (2010).
  Reviews William Wellman's Nothing Sacred (1937).
  Reviews Edward F. Cline's Million Dollar Legs (1932).
  Reviews Phil Karlson's Kansas City Confidential (1952).
  Reviews David Fincher's The Social Network (2010).
  Reviews the films of Abbas Kiarostami.
  Reviews Kenji Mizoguchi's Life of Oharu (1952).
  Reviews Peter and Bobby Farrelly's Hall Pass (2011), Michael Dowse's Take Me Home Tonight (2011) and Cary Fukunaga's Jane Eyre (2011).
  Reviews Clint Eastwood's J. Edgar (2011).
  Reviews Phyllida Lloyd's The Iron Lady (2011), Steven Spielberg's War Horse (2011) and Brad Bird's Mission: Impossible – Ghost Protocol (2011).
  Reviews Stephen Daldry's Extremely Loud & Incredibly Close (2011) and Cameron Crowe's We Bought a Zoo (2011).
  Reviews Gregory La Cava's Unfinished Business (1941).
  Reviews Frederick Wiseman's Crazy Horse (2011), Baltasar Kormákur's Contraband (2012) and Steven Soderbergh's Haywire (2011).
  William Wellman's The Story of G.I. Joe.
  Josh Trank's Chronicle and Agnieszka Holland's In Darkness.
  Joseph Cedar's Footnote and Philippe Falardeau's Monsieur Lazhar.
  Diane Ravitch.
  Ang Lee's Life of Pi and David O. Russell's Silver Linings Playbook.
  Gus Van Sant's Promised Land and Walter Salles' On the Road.
  Michael Apted's 56 Up and Juan Antonio Bayona's The Impossible.
  George Cukor's Dinner at Eight.
  Steven Soderbergh.
 Abbas Kiarostami's Like Someone in Love and Richard LaGravenese's Beautiful Creatures.
  Isabelle Adjani.
  Sam Raimi's Oz the Great and Powerful and Bryan Singer's Jack the Giant Slayer.
  Stanley Kubrick's The Shining.
  Derek Cianfrance's The Place Beyond the Pines and Antoine Fuqua's Olympus Has Fallen.
  Terrence Malick's To the Wonder and Robert Redford's The Company you Keep.
  Brian Helgeland's 42.
 
  Baz Luhrmann's The Great Gatsby.
  Reviews Louis Leterrier's Now You See Me and Sofia Coppola's The Bling Ring.
  James Ponsoldt's The Spectacular Now, Maggie Carey's The To Do List and Paul Schrader's The Canyons.
  Reviews Steve McQueen's 12 Years a Slave and J. C. Chandor's All is Lost. 
  Discusses Matthew McConaughey in Jean-Marc Vallée's Dallas Buyers Club (2013).
  Reviews Francis Lawrence's The Hunger Games: Catching Fire and Alex Gibney's The Armstrong Lie.
  Reviews David O. Russell's American Hustle (2013).
  Reviews John Wells' August: Osage County (2013), Ralph Fiennes' The Invisible Woman (2013) and Peter Berg's Lone Survivor (2013).
  Reviews German television series Generation War (2013) and Tim Story's Ride Along (2014).
 
  Lars von Trier's Nymphomaniac.
  Reviews Alfred Hitchcock's Frenzy (1972).
  Reviews Ivan Reitman's Draft Day (2014) and Errol Morris' The Unknown Known (2013).
  Kelly Reichardt's Night Moves and Richard Ayoade's The Double.
  Woody Allen's Magic in the Moonlight and Anton Corbijn's A Most Wanted Man.
  Reviews Michael Winterbottom's The Trip to Italy (2014). 
  Ava Du Vernay's Selma and Clint Eastwood's American Sniper.

2015–2019
  Reviews J. C. Chandor's A Most Violent Year (2014).

Notes and references

Bibliographies by writer
Bibliographies of American writers